Wicko Morskie  is a village in the administrative district of Gmina Postomino, within Sławno County, West Pomeranian Voivodeship, in north-western Poland. It is located on the Slovincian Coast between the Baltic Sea in the north and Lake Wicko in the south.

The village has a population of 55.

A proving ground of the Polish Air Force is located in Wicko Morskie.

References

Villages in Sławno County